Deewaanapan is a 2001 Indian Hindi romantic movie, released on 16 November 2001. It stars Arjun Rampal and Dia Mirza and is directed by Ashu Trikha. Om Puri and Vinod Khanna have supporting roles.

Plot
Suraj Saxena lives in a remote hill station in India with his dad, mom, and sister, Asha. One day he meets with Kiran Choudhary, who has come on a holiday trip with a group of girls. He offers to show her around, and they fall in love with each other. Suraj is unable to see her home by the train as his dad has chest pains and has to be rushed to the hospital. But Suraj is unable to get Kiran out of his mind and heart. Before his sister gets married, the family decide to relocate to Mumbai, where Suraj enlists in College and makes several new friends, as well as becomes a popular basketball player. He eventually meets Kiran, and both renew their romance. Ranvir Choudhary does not appreciate the attention of a poor man like Suraj on his daughter, and has Suraj brought up before him and introduced to his many friends, which include prominent lawyers, politicians, high ranking civil and municipal employees, the police commissioner as well as the state chief minister. Suraj is warned of dire consequences if he and his family do not leave town immediately. Suraj does not leave town, and hell descends on his family and himself. His mother is unable to purchase food and is publicly humiliated; his father is followed around by Ranvir's goons, harassed, and robbed, and then faces the ultimate humiliation of being publicly arrested, handcuffed, and imprisoned on charges of conspiring against the country and loses his job; and some of Suraj's friends exile him.

Cast 
Arjun Rampal as Suraj Saxena
Dia Mirza as Kiran Choudhary
Vinod Khanna Ranvir Choudhary
Om Puri as Prakash Saxena
Smita Jaykar as Mrs. Saxena
Sharat Saxena as Shankar Deshpande
Avtaar Gill as Chief Minister
Rakesh Bedi as Raju
Chitrapama Banerjee as Asha Saxena
Vikas Sethi as Rocky
Kabir Sadanand as Sam / Sameer Rane
Vishwajeet Pradhan as College Volleyball Coach
Jeetu Verma as Goon of Ranvir Chaudhary

Soundtrack 
The songs for Deewaanapan was composed by Aadesh Shrivastava and lyrics written by Sameer.

Awards and nominations

Star Screen Awards
Won
Star Screen Award for Most Promising Newcomer – Male: Arjun Rampal

Nominated
Star Screen Award for Most Promising Newcomer – Female: Dia Mirza

Zee Cine Awards
Nominated
Zee Cine Award for Best Male Debut: Arjun Rampal

References

External links 
 

2001 films
Films scored by Aadesh Shrivastava
2000s Hindi-language films
Indian romantic action films
2000s romantic action films
Films about rebels
Films directed by Ashu Trikha